Ekeberg is a neighborhood in the city of Oslo, Norway. It may also refer to:

 Ekeberg (surname), list of people with the surname
 Ekeberg Line, light rail line of the Oslo Tramway